On Letting Go is the second studio album by American rock band Circa Survive, released on May 29, 2007, through Equal Vision Records. The album was produced by Bryan McTernan and was recorded throughout 2007 at the Salad Days Recording Studios in Baltimore, Maryland. It follows-up the group's debut full-length studio album, Juturna (2005). The album charted at No. 24 on the U.S. Billboard 200, selling about 24,000 copies in its first week. As of July 11, 2007, it had sold 51,357 copies in the US.

In celebration of its 10-year anniversary, Circa Survive reunited after a brief hiatus from touring and recording music, and announced the On Letting Go Ten Year Anniversary Tour with support from MewithoutYou and Turnover, which took place from January to March 2017. Aside from the anniversary tour, the group also announced the re-release of On Letting Go, which was released in May 2017, which features additional demos and unreleased bonus tracks.

Track listing

Production
The album art is the work of Esao Andrews, who illustrated the covers of all other releases by the band.
On May 14, 2007, the band decided to post the lyrics to the then upcoming album on their website, one song a day, starting with the opener "Living Together".
The album has so far produced two B-sides, both sold digitally for separate charitable causes: "The Most Dangerous Commercials" and "1000 Witnesses".

References

Circa Survive albums
2007 albums
Equal Vision Records albums
Albums produced by Brian McTernan